The Guomao Building (otherwise known as International Foreign Trade Centre) is an office tower and one of the earliest skyscrapers in Shenzhen, China. Its fast construction process was termed the "Shenzhen speed".

Located at the junction of Jiabin Road and Renmin South Road, Luohu District, the building stands 160 metres tall and consists of 50 floors. Construction started on 1 November 1982 and was completed 37 months later on December 29, 1985. This earned the city's rapid development the nickname "Shenzhen Speed". It was the tallest building in China upon completion.

The building stands on a slot of 20,000 square metres and a built-up floor area of 100,000 square metres. It consists mainly of office space (floors 5-43, except 24) but features a revolving restaurant at the 48th and 49th floor and a helipad atop the building. The first five floors are retail spaces.

See also
Shenzhen speed
List of tallest buildings in Shenzhen
Guomao station, the Shenzhen Metro station serving and named after the building

References

Luohu District
Skyscraper office buildings in Shenzhen
Office buildings completed in 1985
Retail buildings in China
Skyscrapers in Shenzhen